Horace Randall Broadnax (born March 22, 1964) is an American college basketball coach. He is currently the head men's basketball coach at Savannah State University. He was born in Plant City, Florida.

Playing career
After graduating from Plant City High School in his native Plant City, Florida, Broadnax played college basketball at Georgetown University and was a member of the 1984 NCAA Division I men's national championship team. During his four years as a member of the Hoyas the team compiled a 115–24 record. He was also a member of the 1985 NCAA Division I men's national championship runner-up team.

Coaching career

Assistant coaching positions
Broadnax began his coaching career in 1992 as an assistant at Florida A&M. In the 1993–94 season, he was an assistant at Bethune-Cookman. The following season, he was video coordinator at Florida.

Valencia Community College
As head coach for Valencia Community College (1995–1997) Broadnax compiled a 29–31 record including the school's first 20 win season in the 1996–1997 season.

Bethune–Cookman
Returning to Bethune-Cookman in 1997 as head coach, Broadnax was twice selected as the Mid-Eastern Athletic Conference (MEAC) Coach of the Year (1999 and 2000). On February 1, 2002, with Bethune-Cookman at 6–12 (3–7 MEAC), Broadnax resigned as head coach to resume his legal career. Assistant coach Clifford Reed became interim head coach and was promoted to long-term head coach after the season.

Savannah State
Broadnax became the men's head basketball coach in 2005. In his sixth year as the head coach of the Tigers, he was named the MEAC Coach of the Year as he guided his team to a 14–2 conference record and their first MEAC regular season title. Savannah State posted a 21–10 overall mark and lead the MEAC in scoring defense, only allowing 58.9 points per game and were second in the conference in scoring margin (+5.4).

Legal career
Broadnax became a member of the Florida Bar in 1993 after obtaining his J.D. degree from Florida State University College of Law in Tallahassee, Florida in 1991 and was a law partner at an Orlando law firm.  He is currently listed as an attorney with the Law Office of Joseph Williams in Plant City, Florida.

Head coaching record

Junior college

College

* Due to NCAA violations, 26 wins were vacated on September 17, 2019: 13 from the 2013–14 season, three from the 2014–15 season, and 10 from the 2017–18 season.

References

External links
 Saannah State biography
 Georgetown History Project profile

1964 births
Living people
African-American basketball coaches
African-American basketball players
American men's basketball coaches
American men's basketball players
Basketball coaches from Florida
Basketball players from Florida
Bethune–Cookman Wildcats men's basketball coaches
College men's basketball head coaches in the United States
Florida lawyers
Florida State University alumni
Georgetown Hoyas men's basketball players
Junior college men's basketball coaches in the United States
People from Plant City, Florida
Point guards
Savannah State Tigers basketball coaches
Sportspeople from Hillsborough County, Florida
21st-century African-American people
20th-century African-American sportspeople